Bloomington Township is located in McLean County, Illinois. As of the 2010 census, its population was 2,851 and it contained 1,127 housing units. it is adjacent to the city of Bloomington.

Geography

Demographics

References

External links
City-data.com
Illinois State Archives

Townships in McLean County, Illinois
Populated places established in 1857
Townships in Illinois
1857 establishments in Illinois